The 2020 European Amateur Team Championship took place 10–12 September at Hilversumsche Golf Club in the Netherlands. It was the 37th men's golf European Amateur Team Championship.

Venue 
The club was founded in 1895, as the fourth golf club in the Netherlands. Its present course consists of nine holes opened in 1918, designed by Henry Burrows, and nine holes opened in 1928, designed by Harry Colt. Latest major course changes was designed by Kyle Philips in 2009.

The championship course was set up with par 72.

Format 
Due to the COVID-19 pandemic, the championship was played in a reduced format, with 14 teams participating, each of them with four players. All competitors played one 18-hole-round of stroke-play on the first day. The team scores were based on the leading three scores of each team.

After the first day the leading eight teams formed flight A and competed in knock-out match-play over the next three days. The teams were being seeded based on their positions after the stroke play. Contests consisted of one foursome game in the morning and two singles in the afternoon. If a game was level after 18 holes, extra holes were played to get a result, although if the overall match result was already determined, later games that were level after 18 holes were halved.

The remaining teams, not qualified for Flight A, competed in a similar bracket in Flight B, to determine their final standings.

Teams 
14 nation teams contested the event. Each team consisted of four players. Switzerland and Italy had qualified for the championship by finishing first and second in the 2019 Division 2. The other teams qualified through the 2019 championship.

Among teams qualified for the championship, England, Scotland, Ireland, Wales, Spain and Portugal did not participate.

Players in the leading teams

Other participating teams

Winners 
Leader of the opening 18-hole competition was team Germany, with a 14-under-par score of 202, eight strokes ahead of host nation Netherlands. Defending champion team Sweden was another four strokes behind.

There was no official award for the lowest individual score, but individual leader was Matti Schmid, Germany, with a 10-under-par score of 62, six strokes ahead of nearest competitor.

Germany won the gold medal, earning their first title, beating defending champions team Sweden in the final 2–1.

Team Switzerland earned the bronze on third place, after beating Italy 2–1 in the bronze match.

Results 
Qualification round

Team standings

* Note: In the event of a tie the order was determined by thebest total of the two non-counting scores of the two rounds.

Individual leaders

Note: There was no official award for the lowest individual score.

Flight A

Bracket

Final games

Flight B

Bracket

Final standings

Sources:

See also 
 Eisenhower Trophy – biennial world amateur team golf championship for men organized by the International Golf Federation.
 European Ladies' Team Championship – European amateur team golf championship for women organised by the European Golf Association.

References

External links 
European Golf Association: Full results

European Amateur Team Championship
Golf tournaments in the Netherlands
European Amateur Team Championship
European Amateur Team Championship
European Amateur Team Championship